The 1944 season was the Chicago Bears' 25th in the National Football League. The team was co-coached by Hunk Anderson and Luke Johnsos with Paddy Driscoll as the assistant coach.

They placed second in the Western Division with a record of 6–3–1, which was tied with the Detroit Lions and trailed the Green Bay Packers. The Bears totaled the second highest tally of points scored and the sixth fewest points conceded.

The Bears were unable to reach the postseason for the first time since 1939 and were unsuccessful in claiming their fourth title of the 1940s. Playing from their home stadium of Wrigley Field, the Bears had to deal with many players leaving the league to serve in World War II.

1944 All-Star Game
The 1944 Chicago College All-Star Game between the Bears and All-Stars was presented in a similar method to the 1943 game. The selection of coaches and players for the College All-Star team was based on the classic games of the previous years and was not dictated by votes from supporters. At the beginning of August, the coach of the collegiate team was revealed to be Lynn Waldorf from Northwestern. His assistants were Jeff Cravath, Bo McMillin, Wes Fry and Henry Frinka. These coaches were responsible for the largest-ever College All-Star squad of 71 individuals. Many of their players were on furlough from their military service and were therefore in prime fitness. On the 30th of August, this collegiate team would play the Chicago Bears at Northwestern University’s Dyche Stadium. 

In the build-up to the match, the All-Stars trained at Dyche Stadium while the Bears trained at Collegeville, Indiana. On August 22, the Bears "received a big boost when star quarterback Sid Luckman was able to report to training camp". Luckman had been permitted to return from Sheepshead Bay where he was involved in Maritime Service to participate in the All-Star match. This resulted in the Bears being tipped favorites as a 9-5 in the betting line with the addition of the quarterback. However, the Bears were missing key players of Danny Fortmann, Lee Artoe and Hampton Pool. The match sold out with approximately 50,000 people in attendance that mainly featured fans from Chicago due to travel restrictions in wartime. Broadcasting was nation-wide through the WGN (AM) and Mutual radio networks.  The Chicago Bears just managed to win the 1944 All-Star match and Francis J. Powers stated in the Chicago Daily News that it was “Not the crushing Bears of other years, but still the Bears, the National Football League Champions”.

Draftees

Impact of World War II
The Bears had 45 individuals leave the club to serve in the United States Armed Forces during World War II. Owner and coach George Halas left his role as Bears coach at the end of the 1942 campaign to join the Navy. At the time of the 1944 season, he operated in the Pacific Ocean where he later received a Bronze Star. The official program of the Bears–Pittsburgh Steelers on December 3 praised how despite Halas' departure, the team was still impressive as "[t]hey have helped the paid-to-play game reach the popular height it now attains, thanks to the astuteness, showmanship and business ability of George Halas". Ed McCaskey, Halas' son-in-law and longtime Chicago Bears executive, also achieved a Bronze Star when fighting in the Army. In Halas' place, Luke Johnsos and Hunk Anderson served as co-head coaches. 

Following the 1943 season, Hall of Fame quarterback Sid Luckman volunteered for military service in the United States Merchant Marine. As he remained in the United States for his service in 1944, he was allowed to be involved in Bears' games on weekends. Luckman was responsible for transporting gasoline in a tanker to Europe, as well as transferring soldiers from Britain to France at the time of the invasion of Normandy in June. That season, he was only able to return and participate in seven games. Notably that season, Luckman was able to provide an 86-yard pass to Ray McLean for a touchdown against the Boston Yanks. The Steelers game featured a tribute to those serving.

Another two Bears Hall of Famers, Joe Stydahar and Dan Fortmann served in the United States Navy during the season. Fortmann then finished his residency and became the team physician for the Los Angeles Rams until 1963.

Regular season
The 1944 season was the third full competition that coincided with World War II. The rosters of many teams were becoming depleted after players were drafted or volunteered for service. The Bears–Steelers game program read, "The big, bad Chicago Bears may not be as ferocious this year as they have been in the past, but if a popularity contest were to be held by pro football followers throughout the country, they would still vote the Bears the most appealing team."

The Bears were unable to replicate their winning season of the previous year in 1943. After losing 19 out of the 28 players from the previous year to leave and serve in the war, the Bears had difficulty recruiting. One of the Bears' co-coaches, Luke Johnsos, stated that the club "signed up anybody who could run around the field twice." In spite of this, the Steelers game's program also praised the ability of the Chicago team, highlighting that "[t]he Bears still can flash the old time power as witness their thundering 28 to 7 upset over the high-flying Philadelphia Eagles only last Sunday when the Eagles were made the favorites. The Bears on their best day, weak or not, can whip any football team in the country. Records go to prove this. Beyond that they are colorful and crowd appealing."

Roster

 Al Babartsky
 Connie Mack Berry
 Max Burnell
 Abe Croft
 Gary Famiglietti
 Jim Fordham
 Bill Glenn
 Duke Greenich
 Al Grygo
 Pete Gudauskas
 Al Hoptowit
 Elmo Kelly
 Johnny Long
 Sid Luckman
 Bob Margarita
 Bob Masters
 Doug McEnulty
 Ray McLean
 Tipp Mooney
 Fred Mundee
 George Musso
 Dick Plasman
 Paul Podmajersky
 Tom Roberts
 Gene Ronzani
 Dom Sigillo
 Rudy Smeja
 Ed Sprikle
 Jake Sweeney
 Bulldog Yurner
 George Wilson
 George Zorich

Schedule

Standings

Statistics
The Bears tallied a total of 258 points scored, the second most in the league. The rushing and passing offenses were each ranked second, while the team recorded the third best kicking and punting statistics.

On defense, the Bears conceded 172 points across the season and ranked sixth in the league for their defensive statistics.

The team were able to achieve 3,167 yards in the season and concede 2006 yards against them. They ranked first in the league for the number of yards in offense and second for the number of yards in defense.

References

Chicago Bears
Chicago Bears seasons
Chicago Bears